Sangharsha ( Collision)  is a 1995 musical drama Bengali film directed by Haranath Chakraborty, under the banner of Laxmi Chitram Films.

Plot
A village is ruled by two powerful personalities: a politician Deepak Dutta and a doctor Samanta. Both characters turn out to be corrupt in their own ways, and employ a group of hooligans who do their dirty work. The leader of Dutta's group is named Bhombol and the head of the doctor's group is named Rana. Rana is the son of a school teacher, but is unemployed, which leads him to ask Samanta for a job. Thereafter, the corrupt doctor begins exploiting him, involving him in anti-social activities. Similarly, MLA Deepak Dutta utilizes Bhombol for the sake of his power and position. Because of these two power-seeking personalities, their village is divided into two territories: Uttorpara and Dakkhinpara.

Shubhankar, a hard-working and honest doctor, comes to the village along with his sister Roma and he soon starts challenging all kinds of local corruption. He fights with Bhombol and his companion to save a pregnant woman and her child, eventually taking the lady, along with her father, in his car to get help. Bhombol and his group plan to kidnap Shubhankar's sister as revenge for Shuvankar refusing to pay their extortion money. Bhombol has a change of heart though when Shubhankar offers to operate on his mother's heart without a fee. While collecting protection money, Rana tortures a tailor to make her give Rs. 500/- to him. Roma hears about this and reports the incident to the police, but the police officer refuses to act. It turns out that he gets bribe money from Dr. Samanta. Rana is instructed to cut Roma's hair in public as an act of revenge and does so.

Shubhankar recognises Rana's father as their childhood teacher and gives him basic treatment for some wounds. When news of Shubhankar's treatment is related to Rana, he feels ashamed for cutting Roma's hair and asks for forgiveness from Shubhankar and Roma. Dr. Samanta makes plans to kill Bhombol's mother and then to accuse Shubhankar of the crime, but the fact that Deepak is the culprit and Bhombol is the victim gets proved in the court with the help of a few photographs.

Deepak's son Rohit and Samanta's daughter Soma are in love with each other and speak out against their father's corruption. Samanta makes a confession in court regarding the conspiracy he made with MLA to kill Bhombol's mother. Dutta and Samanta get imprisoned for five years.

Cast
 Ranjit Mallick as Subhankar
 Tapas Paul as Rana
 Prosenjit Chatterjee as Bhombol
 Laboni Sarkar as Roma
 Abhishek Chatterjee as Rohit
 Chumki Chowdhury as Soma
 Sabitri Chatterjee
 Ruma Guha Thakurta
 Anup Kumar
 Satya Bandyopadhyay
 Manoj Mitra 
 Dilip Ray
 Tarun Kumar
 Dulal Lahiri
 Sunil Mukhopadhyay
 Somasree Chaki

Soundtrack

Track list

References

Bengali-language Indian films
1990s action drama films
Indian action drama films
1990s Bengali-language films
1995 drama films
1995 films
Indian musical drama films
1990s musical drama films
Films directed by Haranath Chakraborty